Ehsan Mosque is an Ahmadi Muslim mosque in Mannheim, in the German state of Baden-Württemberg.

References

Ahmadiyya mosques in Germany
Religious buildings and structures in Baden-Württemberg
Buildings and structures in Mannheim
Mosques completed in 2010